A. Selvaraj is an Indian politician and former Member of the Legislative Assembly of Tamil Nadu. He was elected to the Tamil Nadu legislative assembly as a Pattali Makkal Katchi candidate from Acharapakkam constituency in  2001 election.

References 

Pattali Makkal Katchi politicians
Living people
Year of birth missing (living people)
Tamil Nadu MLAs 2001–2006